Explosophores are functional groups in organic chemistry that give organic compounds explosive properties.

History 
The term was first coined by Russian chemist V. Pletz in 1935 and originally mistranslated in some articles as plosophore. Also of note is an auxoexplose concept (similar to chromophore and auxochrome concept), which is a group that modifies the explosive capability of the molecule. 
The term explosophore has been used more frequently after its use in books such as Organic Chemistry of Explosives by J. Agrawal and R. Hodgson (2007)'.

Properties 
Nitrogen-containing explosophores (groups I, II and III below) are particularly strong because in addition to providing oxygen they react to form molecular nitrogen, which is a very stable molecule, and thus the overall reaction is strongly exothermic.  The gas formed also expands, causing the shock wave which is observed.

Classification  
Pletz grouped the explosophores into eight distinct categories.

I. 
These represent:
 the nitro group, a nitrogen atom bound to two oxygen atoms as well as an organic molecule (e.g. TNT, RDX)
 the nitrate ion, a nitrogen atom bound to three oxygen atoms, (e.g. nitroglycerin, ANFO)
 the nitrite ion, a nitrogen atom bound to two oxygen atoms
Most commercially used explosives include the nitrate ion or the nitro group.

II. 
The azo and azide groups respectively, connected to organic/inorganic compounds (e.g. silver azide , lead azide , ammonium azide )

III. 
The halogenated nitrogen group X:halogen (e.g. nitrogen triiodide  and nitrogen trichloride )

IV.  
The fulminate group (e.g. fulminic acid HONC and mercury fulminate )

V.  
The chlorate and perchlorate groups respectively, connected to organics/inorganics (e.g. potassium chlorate , fluorine perchlorate )

VI. 
The peroxide and ozonide groups respectively, connected to organics/inorganics (e.g. acetone peroxide, butanone peroxide)

VII. 
The acetylide group with its metal derivatives (e.g. silver acetylide , copper acetylide )

VIII. A metal atom connected by an unstable bond to the carbon of certain organic radicals 
This class contains for instance organic compounds of mercury, thallium, and lead.

Other
Other substances have been characterised as explosophores outside of the eight classes as defined by Pletz.

References 

Organic compounds
Explosives